Lucia Soravito de Franceschi (8 December 1939 – 6 July 2019) was an Italian Roman Catholic bishop.

Soravito de Franceschi was born in Italy and was ordained to the priesthood in 1963. He served as bishop of the Roman Catholic Diocese of Adria-Rovigo, Italy from 2004 to 2015.

Notes

1939 births
2019 deaths
21st-century Italian Roman Catholic bishops